Ippolita Maria Sforza (26 January 1493 – 1501) was the daughter of Gian Galeazzo Sforza of Milan and Isabella of Naples.

She was also the niece of Bianca Maria Sforza, who in 1493 had married Holy Roman Emperor Maximilian I. She was named after her maternal grandmother, Ippolita Maria Sforza.

She was engaged to Ferdinand of Aragón, Duke of Calabria.

References 

Ippolita Maria
1493 births
1501 deaths
15th-century Italian women
15th-century Italian nobility
Daughters of monarchs